Livonian cuisine consists of the cuisine of Livonia and the Livonians, and is characterized by the rich use of local foods. Livonians are a coastal people – since they acquire the bulk of their food from the sea, Livonian families have historically eaten a great deal of fish. The most preferred of these is European flounder, but many also consume herring (ēriņ), salted herring, and cod (tūrska).

Pastries
Courland (Kurāmō) Livonians on the shores of Latvia are the source of the famous vegetable pastry, sklandrausis (sūrkak), to which the European Commission gave its ”Traditional Speciality Guaranteed” designation in the autumn of 2013. 
Sklandrausis pastries are regarded as a symbol of the sun, given their round shape and carroty yellowish-orange color. The sklandrausis embodies the natural energy of the sun on Livonian tables during spring equinox celebrations.

References

Latvian cuisine
Estonian cuisine